Grand Army of the Republic may refer to:

Grand Army of the Republic, a US Civil War veterans' organization
 The United States Army, sometimes referred to as the Grand Army of the Republic
Grand Army of the Republic, a fictional military force of clone troopers in the Star Wars franchise

See also
Grand Army of the Republic Highway, an American road, a.k.a. US Route 6 
Army of the Republic (disambiguation)